Tripteris is a genus of African plants in the pot marigold tribe within the daisy family.

Some authors have classified as a Tripteris subgenus of Osteospermum, but more recent studies support separating it as a distinct genus.

 Species

 formerly included
see Inuloides Monoculus Norlindhia Osteospermum

References

External links
 PlantZAfrica.com Tripteris oppositifolia (Aiton) B. Nord. 

Calenduleae
Flora of Africa
Asteraceae genera